Asterocheres lilljeborgi is a species of copepod in the family Asterocheridae. It is found in the British Isles and Scandinavia where it is a semi-parasite of starfish. First described as Asterocheres lilljeborgi in 1859 by the Norwegian marine biologist Jonas Axel Boeck, it is the type species of the genus.

Distribution
The species is found in west and south Norway, south-western Sweden, the Skagerrak, the North Sea, around the coasts of England and northern France as well as the Davis Strait, the Aleutian Islands and Alaska.

Ecology
A. lilljeborgi is associated with starfish, such as the bloody Henry starfish (Henricia oculata) or the blood star (Henricia sanguinolenta). Some 90% of the starfish examined were parasitised.

References 

Siphonostomatoida
Crustaceans described in 1859